This is a list of episodes for The Tonight Show with Jay Leno that aired in 2013 and 2014. The final episode of the series aired on February 6, 2014.

2013

January

February

March

April

May

June

July

August

September

October

November

December

2014

January

February

References

External links
 
 Lineups at Interbridge 
 

Tonight Show with Jay Leno
Tonight Show with Jay Leno
Episodes